Découverte (English: Discovery) is a French language Canadian television series which airs on SRC and is hosted by Charles Tisseyre. The series airs news and documentary features relating to science and technology.

External links
 Découverte at SRC (French)

Ici Radio-Canada Télé original programming
2000s Canadian documentary television series
2010s Canadian documentary television series
2020s Canadian documentary television series